ELR may refer to:

Transportation 
 East Lancashire Railway, a heritage railway in England
 East Lancashire Railway (1844–1859), a former railway in the northwest of England
 East London Railway, see East London Line
 Engineer's Line Reference, an abbreviated code for a section of rail route in the UK
 Cadillac ELR, a luxury hybrid compact coupé

Other 

 Employer of last resort, a formal government job guarantee program
 Environmental lapse rate, a term in meteorology
 The Environmental Law Reporter, a publication by the Environmental Law Institute
  Enzyme-linked receptor, a category of receptors involved in cell signalling
 ExtraLife Radio, a radio show created and hosted by cartoonist Scott Johnson
 European Law Reporter, a specialist journal
 Everybody Loves Raymond, an American TV sitcom (19962005)